William Waring Miller (November 1, 1912 – November 13, 2008) was an American pole vaulter who won a gold medal at the 1932 Summer Olympics. At the U.S. Olympic trials he finished second (4.30 m) behind Bill Graber, who set a new world record at 4.37 m. Graber failed to clear 4.25 m at the Olympics, while Miller set his all-time personal best at 4.31 m and won, in a close competition with Shuhei Nishida.

References

American male pole vaulters
Olympic gold medalists for the United States in track and field
Athletes (track and field) at the 1932 Summer Olympics
Stanford Cardinal men's track and field athletes
Track and field athletes from Kansas
Medalists at the 1932 Summer Olympics
1912 births
2008 deaths
People from Dodge City, Kansas

San Diego High School alumni